Jackie Kurltjunyintja Giles (January 1, 1944 – February 16, 2010)  was a Manyjilyjarra artist.

His work is included in the Art Gallery of New South Wales, the National Gallery of Victoria and the Seattle Art Museum.

References

1944 births
2010 deaths
20th-century Australian artists